East Timor competes in the Southeast Asian Games since the 2003 of the games in Hanoi, Vietnam where they are the youngest Nation to compete, which had just gained independence in 2002; although not being an ASEAN member and despite its geographical location closer to the Pacific archipelago than the Asian continent, making its debut at the games. East Timor never hosted the Southeast Asian Games and best finished that the coutry attained is in 2011 Southeast Asian Games when the country won the first Gold medal by Julianto Pereira and Dorceyana Borgesenth. In 2013 Southeast Asian Games they won 2 Gold Medals, 3 Silver Medals and 5 Bronze Medals and is their current best performance in the games.

Southeast Asian Games
In 2005 Southeast Asian Games was the second Games in which the country had participated. East Timor won three bronze medals, all in Arnis. Elisabeth Yanti Almeida dos Santos had never played the sport previously before competing. The other medallists were Francisca Varela and Fortunato Soares. East Timor participated at the 2011 Southeast Asian Games which were held in the cities of Palembang and Jakarta, Indonesia from 11 November 2011 to 22 November 2011. East Timor got its first ever gold medal since it joined the SEA Games.

Medals by Southeast Asian Games 

Ranking are based on Total Overall Medal

Medals by Summer Sport

Medalist

References